The Great New Gene Krupa Quartet Featuring Charlie Ventura is the final studio album by American jazz drummer Gene Krupa featuring performances recorded in 1964 for the Verve label.

Reception
The Allmusic review awarded the album 3 stars stating "Drummer Gene Krupa's final recording as a leader reunited him with the bombastic tenor saxophonist Charlie Ventura... Ventura's extroverted playing (on tenor, alto and baritone) is not for everyone's taste but he is in generally good form, and even an aging Krupa still retains his youthful excitement and enthusiasm".

Track listing
 "Tickle-Toe" (Lester Young) - 3:08
 "Come Back to Sorrento" (Ernesto De Curtis) - 2:30
 "Undecided" (Sid Robin, Charlie Shavers) - 3:27
 "Sophisticated Lady" (Duke Ellington, Irving Mills, Mitchell Parish) - 2:50
 "Cry Me a River" (Arthur Hamilton) - 3:00
 "Hello, Dolly" (Jerry Herman) - 1:50
 "Stomping Waltz" (Gene, Krupa, Charlie Ventura) - 4:37
 "I Love You" (Harlan Thompson, Harry Archer) - 2:30
 "Take the "A" Train" (Billy Strayhorn) - 3:50
 "Misty" (Erroll Garner) - 3:10
 "I'm Getting Sentimental Over You" (George Bassman, Ned Washington) - 1:50
 "Flying Home" (Benny Goodman, Lionel Hampton, Sid Robin) - 3:27
Recorded in New York City on January 29 (tracks 1, 5, 8-10 & 12) and February 5 (tracks 2-4, 6, 7 & 11), 1964

Personnel
Gene Krupa – drums
Charlie Ventura – alto saxophone, tenor saxophone, baritone saxophone 
John Bunch - piano
Nabil (Knobby) Totah – bass

References

Verve Records albums
Gene Krupa albums
1964 albums
Albums produced by Creed Taylor